Nitin Daniel Mookhey (born 1982) is an Australian politician. He has been a Labor member of the New South Wales Legislative Council since 6 May 2015,

Political career
Mookhey was appointed to the Legislative Council of New South Wales in 2015 to fill a vacancy caused by Steve Whan's resignation.

Following the election of Michael Daley as the Leader of the Opposition in 2018, Mookhey was appointed as opposition cabinet secretary. 

In 2019 following the election of Jodi McKay as leader after Labor's defeat in the 2019 New South Wales state election, Mookhey was elevated to the opposition front bench and appointed the Shadow Minister for Finance and Small Business and Shadow Minister for the Gig Economy.
    
On 11 June 2021, following Chris Minns' election as leader, Mookhey was appointed as the Shadow Treasurer, while retaining the portfolio for the Shadow Minister for the Gig Economy in Minns' Shadow Ministry.

Personal life
Born in Blacktown in Western Sydney to Indian migrants from Punjab, Mookhey is the first parliamentarian in Australian history to be sworn into office on the Bhagavad Gita.

References

1982 births
Living people
Members of the New South Wales Legislative Council
Australian Labor Party members of the Parliament of New South Wales
University of Technology Sydney alumni
University of New England (Australia) alumni
Australian people of Indian Punjabi descent
Australian Hindus
21st-century Australian politicians